Saltuarius is a genus of larger Australian geckos, known collectively as leaf-tailed geckos. The genus was created in 1993 to accommodate some former members of the genus Phyllurus. These geckos appear very similar to the Uroplatus geckos native to Madagascar. However, this is a convergent evolution.

The genus name is derived from the Latin word saltuarius, meaning "keeper of the forest".

Habitat and distribution
The species in the genus Saltuarius inhabit Australia's eastern coastal region, a vegetation composed of rainforests and dry Eucalyptus forests. Saltuarius  cornutus  and Saltuarius swaini are arboreal geckos, the remaining species live on rocky outcrops. They all need a high level of relative air humidity.

Reproduction
These species invariably lay soft-shelled eggs which are buried in humid substrates.

Species
The following seven species are recognized as being valid.
Saltuarius cornutus (Ogilby, 1892) – northern leaf-tailed gecko
Saltuarius eximius Hoskin & Couper, 2013 – Cape Melville leaf-tailed gecko
Saltuarius kateae Couper et al., 2008 – Kate's leaf-tailed gecko
Saltuarius moritzi  Couper et al., 2008 – Moritz's leaf-tailed gecko
Saltuarius salebrosus (Covacevich, 1975) – rough-throated leaf-tailed gecko
Saltuarius swaini (Wells & Wellington, 1985) – southern leaf-tailed gecko
Saltuarius wyberba Couper, Schneider & Covacevich, 1997 – granite leaf-tailed gecko

The former Saltuarius occultus Couper, Covacevich & Moritz, 1993, the long-necked northern leaf-tailed gecko, is now Orraya occultus.

Nota bene: A binomial authority in parentheses indicates that the species was originally described in a genus other than Saltuarius.

References

External links

 
Lizard genera
Geckos of Australia
Taxa named by Jeanette Covacevich
Taxa named by Patrick J. Couper
Taxa named by Craig Moritz